ONE 162: Zhang vs. Di Bella was a Combat sport event produced by ONE Championship that took place on October 21, 2022 at the Axiata Arena in Kuala Lumpur, Malaysia.

Background 
A ONE Strawweight Kickboxing World Championship bout for the vacant title between Zhang Peimian and Jonathan Di Bella headlined the event. Former champion Sam-A Gaiyanghadao announced retired from international competition after returning to Thailand from Singapore and where he had coached at Evolve MMA.

Former Glory Welterweight Champion Nieky Holzken and former ONE Lightweight World Championship challenger Islam Murtazaev were previously scheduled to meet in a lightweight kickboxing bout at ONE: X, but Murtazaev pulled out from the card due to the 2022 Russian invasion of Ukraine, all Russian athletes were removed from the card as a result of the Singaporean government banning them from entering the country and the bout was postponed to this date. In turn, Holzken withdrew from the bout due to an injured and was replaced by Constantin Rusu.

A flyweight muay thai bout between Chorfah Tor.Sangtiennoi and Denis Purić was scheduled to take place at the event. However, Chorfah withdraw due to has sustained an injury during training at the Sangtiennoi Camp and was replaced by Tagir Khalilov.

At the weigh-ins, Tagir Khalilov, Constantin Rusu and Gustavo Balart all failed hydration test and were forced to take catchweights. Khalilov weighed in at 137.5 lbs, 2.5 pounds over the limit, Balart came in at 130.75 lbs, 5.75 lbs over the strawweight limit, and Rusu at 173.25 lbs, 3.25 pounds over the limit.

Results

Bonus awards
The following fighters received $50,000 bonuses.
Performance of the Night: Eko Roni Saputra

See also 

 2022 in ONE Championship
 List of ONE Championship events
 List of current ONE fighters

References 

Events in Kuala Lumpur
ONE Championship events
2022 in mixed martial arts
Mixed martial arts in Malaysia
Sports competitions in Malaysia
October 2022 sports events in Malaysia